Chacang (Chinese: 查仓; Pinyin: Chácāng) is a township in Xainza County, Tibet Autonomous Region of China.

See also
List of towns and villages in Tibet

Notes

Populated places in Nagqu
Xainza County
Township-level divisions of Tibet